William Denis Canniffe (1 April 1885 – 25 September 1956) was a rugby union player who represented Australia.

Canniffe, a lock, claimed 1 international rugby cap for Australia.

References

                   

Australian rugby union players
Australia international rugby union players
1885 births
1956 deaths
Rugby union players from Queensland
Rugby union locks